Population projection, in the field of demography, is an estimate of a future population. 

In contrast with intercensal estimates and censuses, which usually involve some sort of field data gathering, projections usually involve mathematical models based only on pre-existing data may be made by a governmental organization, or by those unaffiliated with a government.

See also 
Census
Population growth
Projections of population growth
Total fertility rate

References 

Demography